Roh Ji-hoon (Hanja: 盧志勳; born July 12, 1990), also spelled Noh Ji-hoon, is a South Korean idol pop singer and dancer signed under Cube Entertainment until 2017, and former contestant of MBC's Birth of a Great Star. He released his first and debut mini album The Next Big Thing on November 7, 2012.

Career

Pre-debut
Roh Ji-hoon was born on July 12, 1990 in Incheon, South Korea, he is the younger sibling in his family and has two older sisters, and he graduated from Seoul Physical Education High school. Roh made it into the top 8 in "Birth of a Great Star" but was eliminated and after his elimination he signed with Cube Entertainment in 2011 and had trained for a year and a half before his debut under Cube Entertainment. Before Roh Ji-hoon joined MBC's "Birth of a Great Star, he had trained and released an OST song for drama "Can Anyone Love" back in 2009 under UFO Entertainment. He also made an appearance in the music video for "Love Virus", sung by BtoB's Eunkwang and Yoo Sungeun.

2012: Debut with "The Next Big Thing"
Roh released his first mini album "The Next Big Thing" marking his first official debut into the music scene. The music video for the mini album's title track "Punishment" was released on Cube Entertainment's official YouTube channel on November 6, 2012 and the mini album was released digitally and physically on the next day. Roh made his debut performance on M! Countdown on November 8, 2012 and also other music shows to promote his title track "Punishment" and his mini album.

2013–2014: New release, A Song For You
On May 27, 2013, Cube Entertainment's CEO Hong Seung-sung released a letter on Cube Entertainment's official website regarding the plans of Cubes' artists. He mentioned that "Cube's male soloist, Jihoonie has started his new challenge. Roh Ji Hoon who has preparing all this while will unfold his plans soon. Just like Jihoonie's bright smile, to keep watch of every day, Jihoonie has put in ever more effort before his debut, please actively give him your support."

On February 4, 2014, Roh released his second official single A Song For You which was composed and written by himself. The song was crowned No. 1 on Bugs and Soribada real time charts 2 days after its release. On February 6, 2014, Roh began promotional appearances on M! Countdown and other music programs.

2015 to present: Comeback, Feeling, No Worries, Finger Heart
On September 16, 2015, Roh Ji Hoon made a comeback with his 2nd Mini Album, "Feeling" or "感 (감)". The self-composed 4th track, "9월 7일" or “September 7”, was written for his close friend, RiSe of Ladies' Code, who was on "Birth of the Great Star" with him and died on that date.

On December 17, 2017, Roh Ji Hoon released a new single, "No Worries" after a hiatus of 2 years. He released the track shortly after leaving Cube Entertainment when his contract ended. The single was released online through Melon in Korea and iTune Music internationally.

On May 23rd, 2019, Roh Ji-hoon came back after one and a half years with the Latin trot single "Finger Heart". Shindong, Jeong Jun-ha, and Ellin of Crayon Pop made an appearance in the music video.

Personal life
In April 2018, Roh Ji-hoon announced his engagement to racing model Lee Eun-hye, after dating her for 3 months, and her becoming pregnant. They officially tied the knot on May 19, 2018.

Discography

Extended plays 
 The Next Big Thing (2012)
 Feeling (2015)

Singles

Filmography

Television series

Reality shows

Concert

Concert participation
2013: United Cube Concert 2013

References

External links
 Official Website

Cube Entertainment artists
1990 births
Living people
People from Incheon
Musicians from Incheon
South Korean male idols
South Korean rhythm and blues singers
South Korean pop singers
South Korean male dancers
South Korean dance musicians
21st-century South Korean  male singers
Mr Trot participants